is a Japanese department store chain owned by , a subsidiary of H2O Retailing Corporation.

Stores
Umeda, Osaka - Main Store (Honten)
Hankyu Men's
Kobe
formerly Sogo Department Stores
Takarazuka
Kawanishi
Senri
Takatsuki, Takatsuki
formerly Seibu Department Stores
Sanda
Nishinomiya
Hankyu Men's Tokyo (Yūrakuchō, Tokyo) - The store was reopened on October 15, 2011 (http://www.h2o-retailing.co.jp/news/pdf/2010/110121_renewal.pdf).
Ooi Shokuhinkan, Tokyo
Tsuzuki, Yokohama
Hakata, Fukuoka - opened in March 2011, as a main tenant of the renovated Hakata Station.

Former stores
Shijō Kawaramachi, Kyoto - closed August 2010

Overseas franchises
Uni-President Department Store Corp., a Uni-President group company, operated two stores in Taiwan under the name Uni-President Hankyu.  The franchise agreement between Uni-President and H2O Retailing was terminated in 2016, renaming all stores Uni-Ustyle.
Kaohsiung, Taiwan
Taipei, Taiwan

See also
Hanshin Department Store - one of two names of the department stores owned by Hankyu Hanshin Department Stores, Inc.

External links 

 Official website 
 Hankyu Hanshin Department Stores, Inc. (corporate information) 

Department stores of Japan
Companies based in Osaka Prefecture